Antonio Díaz Jurado (4 August 1969 – 27 April 2013) was a Spanish professional footballer who played as a midfielder.

Club career
Born in Madrid, Díaz started playing with Real Madrid Castilla, moving in 1992 to neighbouring club Getafe CF. He started his professional career in 1994–95, helping UD Salamanca promote to La Liga in the playoffs.

At the professional level, Díaz also represented CA Osasuna, Villarreal CF and SD Compostela, playing with all the clubs in Segunda División and the second in the top flight in the 1998–99 season. He made his debut in the latter competition on 31 August 1998, starting in a 1–4 away loss against Real Madrid.

Díaz retired in June 2005 at nearly 36 after spells in the lower leagues, including the 2001–02 campaign with Granada CF in Segunda División B.

Later life and death
After retiring, Díaz returned to Villarreal, working as youth teams manager. He died on 27 April 2013 at the age of 43, due to unknown causes.

Honours
Segunda División B: 1993–94

References

External links

1969 births
2013 deaths
Footballers from Madrid
Spanish footballers
Association football midfielders
La Liga players
Segunda División players
Segunda División B players
Tercera División players
Real Madrid Castilla footballers
Getafe CF footballers
UD Salamanca players
CA Osasuna players
Villarreal CF players
SD Compostela footballers
Granada CF footballers
Águilas CF players